St Martin's is a civil parish in North Yorkshire, England. It is located south of the town of Richmond, covering the residential areas south of the River Swale, including the former Richmond railway station and Holly Hill.

Located within the parish is the ruin of St. Martin's Priory, a former Benedictine house.

History 
Richmond railway station is located within the parish, which is separated from Richmond by the River Swale. The position of the station was because it was considered "geographically impossible" to locate the station within the town. Of the ten listed buildings in the parish, seven are associated with the railway terminus, one is the bridge at the west of the parish into Richmond, and two are those associated with St Martin's Priory, the namesake of the parish.

Governance 
Historically, St Martin's was in the ecclesiastical parish of Catterick, and was its own extra parochial area, before being made into a civil parish in 1858. It was originally in the wapentake of Gilling West, but was moved into the wapentake Hang East, and now is in Richmondshire, in North Yorkshire. In 2001, the parish had a population of 242, which had dropped to 222 by the time of the 2011 census. In 2015, North Yorkshire County Council estimated the population of the parish to be 200.

References

External links 

St Martin's Parish Council webpage
Civil parishes in North Yorkshire
Richmondshire